Cooma–Polo Flat Airport  is an unlicensed airfield located in Polo Flat, an industrial area of Cooma, New South Wales, Australia. The airfield is used primarily for recreational flying. Polo Flat is at a lower elevation than the nearby Cooma–Snowy Mountains Airport and is less prone to closure during bad weather and fog.

History 
Polo Flat airfield was established by 1921, when the aviation pioneer Charles Kingsford Smith arrived at the landing ground on a barnstorming visit to the region. In the 1950s and 60s, the airfield was further developed to service the Snowy Mountains Scheme and the original hangars and terminal building are still in use today.

In 1998, the  site was sold by the Snowy Mountains Hydro-electric Authority for private use. In 2001, the facilities were adapted by the new owners to provide facilities for training pilots with disabilities through the "Wheelies with Wings" charity organisation. In 2003 a flying school, Snowy Aviation Academy, was established at the site.

Current operations 
Polo Flat airport and the Snowy Aviation Academy constitute an approved Recreational Aviation Australia flight training facility. It offers training and aircraft hire as well as secure hangarage for private aircraft and a friendly community of aviation enthusiasts.

Accidents and incidents 
On 20 May 1976, a Pilatus PC-6 Turbo Porter aircraft, registration VH-SMB owned by the Snowy Mountains Hydroelectric Authority struck a radio tower and crashed on approach to Polo Flat, killing all four on board.

See also
List of airports in New South Wales

References 

Airports in New South Wales
RA-Aus Approved Flight Training Facilities
Airports established in 1921